Daya Kishan Sapru (16 March 1916 – 20 October 1979), was an Indian actor famed for a variety of character roles in Hindi cinema, particularly villains, judges and aristocrats in crime thrillers and dramas. His most notable performances were in Bollywood productions of between the late 1950s and early 1970s, including Sahib Bibi Aur Ghulam, Heer Raanjha, Pakeezah, Kala Pani, Dooj Ka Chand,  Tere Mere Sapne, Humjoli, Jewel Thief, and Deewar.

Born to Kashmiri Pandit parents in 1916, Sapru made his Bollywood debut in Chand (1944), starring Prem Adib, another Kashmiri Pandit actor. By the early 1970s, Sapru had risen to prominence as a villain in crime thrillers. Although he died in 1979, he continued to appear in several films that were released in the 1980s, including Krodhi (1981).

His son Tej Sapru and younger daughter Preeti Sapru are actors in Punjabi and Hindi films. His elder daughter Reema Rakesh Nath is a scriptwriter and director, and her son, actor Karan Nath, is Sapru's only grandson.

Selected filmography

References

External links
 

1916 births
1979 deaths
Male actors in Hindi cinema
Male actors from Jammu and Kashmir
20th-century Indian male actors
Kashmiri people